Petar Čobanković (29 January 1957) is a former Croatian politician who served as Minister of Regional Development, Forestry and Water Management.

Čobanković finished elementary and high school in Ilok, after that he attended Faculty of Agriculture at University of Zagreb where he obtained his B.Sc. in agriculture. From 2000 until 2001 he was Prefect of Vukovar-Syrmia County. Between 2003 and 2008 he was the Minister of Agriculture, Forestry and Water Management in the Cabinet of Ivo Sanader I. On January 12, 2008 he was named Minister of Regional Development, Forestry and Water Management in the Cabinet of Ivo Sanader II. In 2010 he became deputy-prime minister of Government of Croatia in the Cabinet of Jadranka Kosor.

Čobanković pleaded guilty and he was sentenced in March 2013 to one year in jail for corruption. The sentence was consequently reduced to a community sentence in an exchange for full cooperation with the prosecutor in the corruption case against the former Croatian premier Ivo Sanader.

References

1957 births
Living people
People from Ilok
Croatian Democratic Union politicians
Faculty of Agriculture, University of Zagreb alumni
Croatian politicians convicted of corruption